Zoran Latifić is a Serbian former professional basketball player.

Playing career 
Latifić played for a Belgrade-based team Crvena zvezda of the Yugoslav First League from 1971 to 1974. His teammates were Zoran Slavnić, Dragan Kapičić, Ljubodrag Simonović, Dragiša Vučinić, and Goran Rakočević among others. With them, he won a FIBA European Cup Winners' Cup in 1974, a National Championship in 1972, and a National Cup in 1975.

During the 1974–75 season, Latifić played for Mladost Zemun.

Career achievements 
 FIBA European Cup Winners' Cup winner: 1 (with Crvena zvezda: 1973–74)
 Yugoslav League champion: 1 (with Crvena zvezda: 1971–72).
 Yugoslav Cup winner: 1 (with Crvena zvezda: 1974–75)

Personal life 
His brother Goran is a former basketball player for Partizan (1968–1977). 

Latifić is a great-nephew of Gavrilo Princip, a member of Young Bosnia who assassinated Archduke Franz Ferdinand of Austria and the Archduke's wife in 1914.

References

Living people
KK Crvena zvezda players
KK Mladost Zemun players
Power forwards (basketball)
Serbian men's basketball players
Serbian people of Bosnia and Herzegovina descent
Yugoslav men's basketball players
Year of birth missing (living people)
Place of birth missing (living people)